Kent Russell is an American writer. He has written books and magazine pieces, with essays appearing in such publications as GQ Magazine, Harper's Magazine, n+1 The Believer, and The New Republic.

Career
Russell is best known for his debut book, I Am Sorry to Think I Have Raised a Timid Son. A collection of Russell’s essays, the book documents his personal journey as a child. In 2015, Russell was recognized in Refinery29's list of "21 New Authors You Need to Know."

In July 2020, Russell published his second book, the nonfiction In the Land of Good Living: A Journey to the Heart of Florida. Reviewing for The Atlantic, writer Lauren Groff called the book "brilliant," adding, "I’ve never read an account of our gorgeous and messed-up state that is a more appropriate match of form and function. The spirit of Don Quixote presides over its buddy-trip plotline. . . This feels like both the real and the true story of Florida."

Russell has also contributed to GQ Magazine, n+1, Harper's Magazine, The Believer, and The New Republic. Russell was also a finalist for Brooklyn Public Library’s Eagles Prize. In 2015, Russell was recognized in Refinery29's list of "21 New Authors You Need to Know."

Personal
Russell's sister is fellow writer Karen Russell. He lives in Brooklyn, New York.

Interviews 
 NPR
 Salon Magazine
 South Florida
 Signature

Bibliography 
 2020.

 2015.

References 

Living people
21st-century American novelists
Year of birth missing (living people)